Welcome to Lagos is a 2016 novel written by Nigeria writer Chibundu Onuzo. It was first published on May 1, 2016, by Catapult & Co., an imprint of Black Balloon Publishing.

Plot summary
The novel follows Chike Ameobi; a Nigerian soldier who opted to retire rather than killing innocent civilians; Yemi; a private and junior to Chike Ameobi who admires Ameobi's uprightness and also decides to quit with him. On their way, they met Oma; who called her marriage quit due to abuse; Isoken; a sixteen-year-old girl who managed to escape from the hands of the rebel fighters; FineBoy; an ex-militant, who ran away from militancy to chase his dream as a radio presenter. The novel describes the daily struggle of the common man in Lagos; the mischievousness and flamboyance of corrupt politicians and the need to survive.

References 

2016 Nigerian novels
Faber and Faber books
Black Balloon Publishing books